Terry Garland (June 3, 1953 – September 19, 2021), who was born in Johnson City, Tennessee, was an American blues guitarist, songwriter and singer. The Allmusic journalist Niles J. Frantz wrote that Garland was "a country blues interpreter who plays a National steel guitar, often with a slide, in the style of Bukka White and Fred McDowell."

Biography
His first two albums were released by BMG/First Warning.

The harmonica player Mark Wenner, of the Nighthawks, contributed to Garland's records.

His final release was Whistling in the Dark, issued in 2006.

Discography
Trouble in Mind (1991)
Edge of the Valley (1992)
The One to Blame (1996)
Out Where the Blue Begins (2001)
Whistling in the Dark (2006)

See also
List of country blues musicians
List of slide guitarists

References

External links
[ Biography] at Allmusic
Biography at Terrygarland.com

1953 births
Living people
American blues guitarists
American male guitarists
Slide guitarists
American male singers
American blues singers
Songwriters from Tennessee
People from Johnson City, Tennessee
Blues musicians from Tennessee
Guitarists from Tennessee
20th-century American guitarists
20th-century American male musicians
American male songwriters